Saiguède is a commune in the Haute-Garonne department in southwestern France, near the small town of Saint-Lys, and approximately 30 km west of Toulouse.

Geography
The commune is bordered by five other communes: Bonrepos-sur-Aussonnelle to the north, Fontenilles to the northeast, Saint-Lys to the east, Sainte-Foy-de-Peyrolières to the south, and finally by Saint-Thomas to the west.

Features 
Saiguède has a central public area, featuring a small school, teaching ages up to 11 years, a pétanque square, and a small sports court. There is also a pavilion (kiosque).

Population

The inhabitants of Saiguède are known as Saiguediens.

See also
Communes of the Haute-Garonne department

References

Communes of Haute-Garonne